Royer–Nicodemus House and Farm, also known as the Renfrew Museum and Park, is a historic home and farm located at Waynesboro in Franklin County, Pennsylvania. The main house was built about 1812, and is a 2 1/-2-story, four bay stone dwelling, with a two bay addition built about 1815.  It was restored in 1974–1975.  The property also includes the brick Fahnestock farmstead (1812), a small stone butcher / smoke house, stone and log milkhouse, and large frame barn with distinctive cupolas built in 1896.

The property was deeded to the Borough of Waynesboro in 1973, and has operated as Renfrew Museum and Park since 1975.

It was listed on the National Register of Historic Places in 1976.

References

External links

Renfrew Museum and Park website

History museums in Pennsylvania
Farms on the National Register of Historic Places in Pennsylvania
Houses on the National Register of Historic Places in Pennsylvania
Houses completed in 1815
Houses in Franklin County, Pennsylvania
Museums in Franklin County, Pennsylvania
Parks in Franklin County, Pennsylvania
National Register of Historic Places in Franklin County, Pennsylvania